Ella Molly Natalia Pettersson Hammar (born 16 October 1995), known professionally as Molly Hammar, is a Swedish singer and songwriter who participated in the talent show Idol 2011 broadcast on TV4, where she reached fourth place.

Career

2011: Idol

In September 2011 Molly took part in the eighth season of Idol. In the Quarter-Finals she sang Alicia Keys' "A Woman's Worth", she finished in the Top 12 and progressed through to the Semi-Final. In the Semi-Final she sang U2's "Where the Streets Have No Name", she progressed to the Finals. In the Finals she made it through the final 4 before being eliminated.

2015–present: Melodifestivalen

Hammar participated in Melodifestivalen 2015 with the song "I'll Be Fine", finishing sixth in the semifinal and being eliminated. The song peaked at number 65 on the Swedish Singles Chart. However the song peaked at number 6 on Digilistan (The Swedish download chart) ahead of the songs that qualified for Andra Chansen.

She competed in Melodifestivalen 2016 with the song "Hunger", and qualified to andra chansen from the second semi-final before being eliminated.
She co-wrote the Maltese song for the Eurovision Song Contest 2016 "Walk on Water" performed by Ira Losco. She performed with Ira Losco as her backing vocalist at the Eurovision Song Contest.

Personal life
Molly Pettersson Hammar was previously in a relationship with singer Robin Stjernberg whom she met during her time at Idol, until 2015.

Discography

Singles

Notes

References

External links

Swedish pop singers
1995 births
Living people
Singers from Stockholm
Idol (Swedish TV series) participants
English-language singers from Sweden
21st-century Swedish singers
21st-century Swedish women singers
Melodifestivalen contestants of 2016
Melodifestivalen contestants of 2015